Waldniel is a village, part of the municipality Schwalmtal in the district Viersen, North Rhine-Westphalia, Germany. It has 11,750 inhabitants (December 2020).

History
The first humans lived at the location of the modern Waldniel in the neolithic (2000 v. Chr.) In 1020, this place was first mentioned in a document.

Geography
The Kranenbach flows through Waldniel.

Notable residents

 Albin Windhausen (1863–1946), painter
 Josef Windhausen (1888–1946), local politician (CDU)
 Heinz Küppenbender (1901–1989), manager
 Ludwig Gabriel Schrieber (1907–1975), sculptor, painter and draughtsman
 Ernst van Aaken (1910–1984), sports physician and trainer
 Rudi Fuesers (1928–2010), trombonist of modern jazz
 Herbert Dörenberg (born 1945), football coach and former professional footballer
 Stefan Berger (born 1969), Member of Parliament, Landtag of North Rhine-Westphalia
 Bernhard Rösler (1906–1973), entrepreneur, honorary citizen of the municipality of Schwalmtal (1972)
 Joachim "Joko" Winterscheidt (born 1979), actor and presenter (grew up in Waldniel)
 Karl Oelers (1913–1971), manufacturer

References

Villages in North Rhine-Westphalia